Lilaeopsis is a genus of several species of flowering plants in the family Apiaceae. Known commonly as grassworts or microswords. L. brasiliensis is used as a decorative plant for the foreground of aquaria.

Species include:
 Lilaeopsis brasiliensis
 Lilaeopsis carolinensis – Carolina grasswort
 Lilaeopsis chinensis – Eastern grasswort
 Lilaeopsis masonii – Mudflat quillplant
 Lilaeopsis novae-zelandiae
 Lilaeopsis occidentalis – Western grasswort
 Lilaeopsis schaffneriana

References

 Affolter, J. M. 1985. A monograph of the genus Lilaeopsis (Umbelliferae). Syst. Bot. Monogr. 6:38. 
 Gitte Petersen, James Affolte, A New Species of Lilaeopsis (Apiaceae) from Mauritius, Novon, Vol. 9, No. 1 (Spring, 1999), pp. 92–94 - describing L. mauritiana

 
Apioideae genera